This is a list of heritage sites in Stellenbosch in the Western Cape, as recognized by the South African Heritage Resource Agency.

Heritage sites in Stellenbosch town

|}

Heritage sites near Stellenbosch town

|}

See also
Cape Dutch architecture
Heritage Western Cape
Stellenbosch Museum

References

External links

Stellenbosch
Stellenbosch
Heritage sites in Stellenbosch
Lime kilns in South Africa